Eurombah is a rural locality split between the Shire of Banana and the Western Downs Region, Queensland, Australia.

Geography 
The Dawson River forms part of the northern boundary.

The neighbourhoods of Peek-A-Doo and Hornet Bank are within the locality.

History 
The Hornet Bank massacre in 1857 happened nearby.

The Peek-A-Doo State School opened on 3 February 1964 at 10118 Roma Taroom Road. It was mothballed on 13 April 2010 (having no students). In June 2010, there was outrage when it was announced that the then-mothballed school would be allocated $250,000 by the Australian Government's Building the Education Revolution school building program to construct a resource centre. However, it was not constructed as the school closed on 31 December 2010. The school's website was archived.

Heritage listings
Eurombah has a number of heritage-listed sites, including:
 Fraser family grave site and memorial, Hornet Bank: Hornet Bank Road:

Education 
There are no schools in Eurombah. The nearest primary schools are Taroom State School in Taroom and Gromont State School in Grosmont. The nearest secondary schools are Taroom State School and Wandoan State School in Wandoan, but both of these schools provide education only to Year 10. Other alternatives are distance education and boarding schools.

References 

Western Downs Region
Shire of Banana
Localities in Queensland